Amador County Airport , also known as Westover Field, is a county-owned public-use airport in Amador County, California, United States. It is located two nautical miles (3.7 km) northwest of the central business district of Jackson, California. The airport is mostly used for general aviation.

Although many U.S. airports use the same three-letter location identifier for the FAA and IATA, this facility is assigned JAQ by the FAA but has no designation from the IATA (which assigned JAQ to Jacquinot Bay Airport in Papua New Guinea).

Facilities and aircraft 
It has one runway designated 1/19 with an asphalt surface measuring 3,401 by 60 feet (1,037 x 18 m).

For the 12-month period ending October 1, 1997, the airport had 25,000 aircraft operations, an average of 68 per day: 99% general aviation, <1% air taxi, and <1% military. At that time there were 89 aircraft based at this airport: 88% single-engine, 5% multi-engine, 3% helicopter and 5% ultralight.

References

External links 
 Aerial image as of 16 August 1998 from USGS The National Map
 

Airports in California
Buildings and structures in Amador County, California
California
Airports
Transportation in Amador County, California